This is a list of places on the Victorian Heritage Register in the City of Brimbank in Victoria, Australia. The Victorian Heritage Register is maintained by the Heritage Council of Victoria.

The Victorian Heritage Register, as of 2020, lists the following 13 state-registered places within the City of Brimbank:

References

Brimbank
City of Brimbank